Idar-Oberstein station serves the town of Idar-Oberstein in the German state of Rhineland-Palatinate. It is on the Nahe Valley Railway and is classified by Deutsche Bahn as a category 4 station. It is regularly served by Regional-Express and Regionalbahn services and in the past it was served by freight traffic. The station is located in the centre of Idar-Oberstein.

History
Idar-Oberstein station was opened on 15 December 1859 as Oberstein station. At that time the only line ran to Bingen am Rhein. In 1860, the Nahe Valley Railway was completed to the Saarland, making train travel possible to Neunkirchen, where there was a connection to the Palatine Ludwig Railway (Pfälzische Ludwigsbahn). Later links were also opened from the Nahe Valley Railway to the Glan Valley Railway (Glantalbahn), to Baumholder and the current district of Birkenfeld via the Birkenfeld Railway. Today, the Nahe Valley Railway is one of the main axes of passenger services in Rhineland-Palatinate. In addition, the station was formerly the starting point of the Idar-Oberstein tramway (1900 to 1956) and the Idar-Oberstein trolleybus service (1956 to 1969).

Infrastructure 

Idar-Oberstein station has an entrance building. In the course of renovation of the station, the platforms were renovated and made accessible for the handicapped by lift. In addition, the platforms were equipped with tactile paving. In November 2008, the building was completely repainted and decorated with pictures of the city's attractions.

Rail services
Idar-Oberstein station is served by the following regional rail services:

Notes

Railway stations in Rhineland-Palatinate
Railway stations in Germany opened in 1859
Buildings and structures in Birkenfeld (district)